Daal dhokli  is an Indian dish common in Rajasthani and Gujarati cuisine, made by boiling wheat flour pieces in a pigeon pea stew. A similar preparation is called varanfal, or chakolyaa in Marathi.

Preparation 

Daal dhokli can be made with various types of lentils (or daal). Some commonly used daals  include toor (pigeon peas), masoor (red lentil), and moong (mung bean). The daal is then pressure-cooked with water and tempered with spices to create a stew. The dhokli, or wheat flour pieces, are made by kneading a dough of wheat flour, salt, and water, rolling it, and cutting into pieces.

Some variations add peanuts. Other flavors in the dish can come from kokum, jaggery, and spices like cumin and asafoetida.

References 

Indian cuisine
Rajasthani cuisine
Gujarati cuisine
Maharashtrian cuisine